Aur Pyaar Ho Gaya (English: And I Fell in Love) (International title: Love Oh Love) is an Indian television drama show, which premiered on 6 January 2014 on Zee TV and on Zee World as Love Oh Love on 14 August 2017. It stars Kanchi Singh and Mishkat Varma. The show is a coming of age story about two young people who have different notions about love. It was replaced by Satrangi Sasural in its timeslot.

Plot
Avni, the daughter of Rajasthani business family Khandelwals falls in love with her father's assistant Raj. Akshat and Arpita are also in love. In past, Vikram and Bhawana (Sangeeta) were lovers. But, the Kapoors killed the Purohits except Vikram. This was a game by Virat to avenge Sangeeta for slapping him. To keep his secret, Virat kills Abhaas, but is jailed after he is exposed by Avni and Raj. The two families live happily.

Cast

Main
 Mishkat Varma as Raj Purohit: Anjali and Vikram's son; Arpita's adoptive brother; Avni's husband
 Kanchi Singh as Avni Khandelwal Purohit: Sangeeta and Suket's daughter; Akshat and Abhaas's sister; Raj's wife
 Parichay Sharma as Abhaas Khandelwal: Sangeeta and Suket's younger son; Akshat and Avni's brother

Recurring
 Reena Kapoor as Sangeeta "Bhavna" Kapoor Khandelwal: Virat's sister; Vikram's former lover; Suket's wife; Akshat, Abhaas and Avni's mother
 Rajeev Singh as Suket Khandelwal: Sangeeta's husband; Akshat, Abhaas and Avni's father
 Rajeev Verma as Bauji
 Wasim Mushtaq as Akshat Khandelwal: Sangeeta and Suket's elder son; Abhaas and Avni's brother; Arpita's husband
 Niketa Agrawal as Arpita Khandelwal:Akshat's wife and Raj's Rakhi sister
 Vinay Jain as Vikram Purohit: Sangeeta's former lover; Anjali's husband; Raj's father; Arpita's adoptive father
 Rukhsar Rehman as Anjali Purohit: Vikram's wife; Raj's mother; Arpita's adoptive mother
 Bharat Chawda as Virat Kapoor: Sangeeta's brother; Akshat, 
 Gunjan Khare as Madhuri Arora
 Anup Sharma as Jashan Singh Arora 
 Ashita Dhawan as Savri Pratap Singh
 Sailesh Gulabani as Siddharth Pratap Singh
 Naveen Saini as Satyaraj Chauhan
 Jaanvi Sangwan as Jahnvi Agarwal
 Navi Bhangu as Samarth
 Mayur Mehta as Amit
 Neelam Gandhi as Devika
 Manasi Salvi as Manasi

References

External links

Zee TV original programming
Indian drama television series
2014 Indian television series debuts
Indian television soap operas